George Akers was a footballer who played in The Football League for Preston North End.

References

English footballers
Preston North End F.C. players
English Football League players
Year of death missing
Year of birth missing
Association football forwards